Nijinsky (feminine: Niżyńska, plural: Niżyńscy) may refer to:

Vaslav Nijinsky (1890–1950), ballet dancer and choreographer
Bronislava Nijinska (1890–1972), dancer, choreographer and teacher
Kyra Nijinsky (1914–1998), ballet dancer
Nijinsky (film) (1980)
Nijinsky (horse), race horse
Nijinsky Stakes (disambiguation), various horse races named after the above

Polish-language surnames